The Men's 100 metre backstroke competition of the 2014 FINA World Swimming Championships (25 m) was held on 3 December with the heats and the semifinals and 4 December with the final.

Records
Prior to the competition, the existing world and championship records were as follows.

Results

Heats
The heats were held at 10:20.

Semifinals
The semifinals were held at 18:14.

Semifinal 1

Semifinal 2

Final
The final was held at 18:34.

References

Men's 100 metre backstroke